Hulda Marshall

Hulda Marshall (born Hulda Olivia Agt Jorgensen, also known as Hulda Ulivia Agt Jorgensen, Mrs Tom Marshall, Mrs T Marshall, Hilda Marshall) (born 7 Sep 1861 Fredericksburg, Copenhagen, Denmark - died 30 July 1938 North Sydney, New South Wales, Australia) was an artist, arts patron and philanthropist.   

As a watercolour and oils artist, a member of the Royal Art Society, the Strathfield Sketch Club, the Society of Women Painters, and a contributor to the Women's Work Exhibition (Sydney and Melbourne 1907), Hulda exhibited extensively from the late 1800s to 1930.         

A notable patron of the arts in Sydney, her role was recognised in 1929, along with that of her solicitor husband, Thomas Marshall, when they were made life-long members of the Royal Art Society, along with Dame Edith Walker and Dame Nellie Melba.    

Her enduring legacy is the Marshall Bequest, which she and her husband Thomas Marshall established in 1929, for the purpose of acquiring art works for the NSW Art Gallery. The bequest continues to perform this function, more than 90 years later.   

References: